Vasqueziella is a genus of orchids. Only one species is known, Vasqueziella boliviana, native to Peru and Bolivia.

References

External links
IOSPE orchid photos, Vasqueziella boliviana Dodson 1982
Narod, Vasqueziella boliviana photo

Orchids of Peru
Orchids of Bolivia
Monotypic Epidendroideae genera
Stanhopeinae genera
Stanhopeinae